Anton Carl Hartmann (1803 - ??) was a Norwegian politician.

He was elected to the Norwegian Parliament in 1854 and 1857, representing the constituency of Christiansand. He worked as a merchant in that city.

References

1803 births
Year of death missing
Members of the Storting
Politicians from Kristiansand
Norwegian businesspeople